Adipic acid dihydrazide (ADH) is a chemical used for cross-linking water-based emulsions. It can also be used as a hardener for certain epoxy resins. ADH is a symmetrical molecule with a C4 backbone and the reactive group is C=ONHNH2.  Dihydrazides are made by the reaction of an organic acid with hydrazine.  Other dihydrazides with different backbones are also common, including isophthalic dihydrazide (IDH) and sebacic dihydrazide (SDH).

References

External links 
 Preparation of Enzyme Conjugate through Adipic Acid  Dihydrazide as Linker
 
 Technical Article About the Chemistry and Use of Dihydrazides in Thermosets, Including ADH

Hydrazides